Perrette may refer to:

 Pauley Perrette (born 1969), American actress and singer
 Perrette Pradier (1938 –2013), French actress and dubbing director

See also 

 Perretta